Spring Creek Hatchery State Park is a public recreation area lying within the Columbia River Gorge National Scenic Area on Route 14 in Skamania County, Washington. The state park occupies  directly across the Columbia River from Hood River, Oregon. It offers excellent windsurfing and kiteboarding opportunities, as well as picknicking, fishing, and wildlife viewing. The park lies next to the Spring Creek National Fish Hatchery, which offers interpretive programs and self-guided tours.

The 5-acre windsurfing area is sometimes known as "The Hatchery" or "The Hatch". The rough water is considered expert-level.

References

External links 
Spring Creek Hatchery State Park Washington State Parks and Recreation Commission 
Spring Creek Hatchery State Park Brochure Washington State Parks and Recreation Commission 
Spring Creek Hatchery State Park Map Washington State Parks and Recreation Commission

State parks of Washington (state)
Parks in Skamania County, Washington